The 2005 Dartmouth Big Green football team was an American football team that represented Dartmouth College during the 2005 NCAA Division I-AA football season. Dartmouth finished second-to-last in the Ivy League.

The Big Green compiled a 2–8 record and were outscored 260 to 126. Joshua Dooley and Anthony Gargiulo were the team captains. Head coach Eugene "Buddy" Teevens returned to lead the Big Green for the 2005 season. He had previously been the head coach at Dartmouth from 1987 to 1991. 

The Big Green's 1–6 conference record placed seventh in the Ivy League standings. Dartmouth was outscored 162 to 64 by Ivy opponents.

Dartmouth played its home games at Memorial Field on the college campus in Hanover, New Hampshire.

Schedule

References

Dartmouth
Dartmouth Big Green football seasons
Dartmouth Big Green football